Marzuki Alie (Jawi: مرزوقي علي ; born 6 November 1955) is an Indonesian politician and businessman who served as the fifteenth speaker of the People's Representative Council from 2009 until 2004. A member of the Democratic Party until 2021, he was kicked from the party during an internal leadership struggle within the party. Marzuki Alie also served as Secretary General of Partai Demokrat, the party formed by Susilo Bambang Yudhoyono.

Marzuki Alie has PhD in Political Science from Universiti Utara Malaysia, and also a degree in management from Sriwijaya University, Palembang. Before his political tenure, Marzuki worked as a civil servant in the Ministry of Finance. He has also served as director of PT. Semen Baturaja, is a state-owned cement company.

In 2012, he was part of the State visit of President Susilo Bambang Yudhoyono to the United Kingdom. He was appointed an Honorary Knight Commander of the Order of St Michael and St George.

Marzuki lost his Jakarta-3 seat in the 2014 election as Demokrat was unable to obtain enough votes to win any seats in the constituency.

Education history 

 Marketing Politics - PhD Program, Universiti Utara Malaysia
 Corporate Finance - Magister Manajemen UNSRI, Palembang
 Production Management - Fakultas Ekonomi UNSRI, Palembang
 SMA Xaverius I Palembang, Jurusan IPA
 SMP Negeri IV Palembang
 SD Negeri 36 Palembang

Career history 

 Commissioner of PT.Global Perkasa Investindo group, 2006–2009
 Commercial Director of PT.Semen Baturaja (Persero) Palembang, 1999–2006
 PT.Semen Baturaja (Persero) Palembang, Baturaja, Lampung, Jakarta
 Civil Servants in KPN, Indonesian Ministry of Finance Palembang, 1979–1980
 Civil Servants in di Ditjen Aanggaran, Indonesian Ministry of Finance Jakarta, 1975–1979

References

External links
 Official website

1955 births
Living people
Speakers of the People's Representative Council
Indonesian people of Malay descent
Honorary Knights Commander of the Order of St Michael and St George
People from Palembang
Democratic Party (Indonesia) politicians
Sriwijaya University alumni